Snow White is an upcoming American musical fantasy film directed by Marc Webb, from a screenplay by Greta Gerwig and Erin Cressida Wilson. Co-produced by Walt Disney Pictures and Marc Platt Productions, it is a live-action adaptation of Disney's 1937 animated film, which itself is loosely based on the 1812 fairy tale of the same title by the Brothers Grimm. The film stars Rachel Zegler as Snow White and Gal Gadot as the Evil Queen.

Plans for a remake of 1937's Snow White and the Seven Dwarfs were confirmed in October 2016, with Wilson announced as a screenwriter. Webb entered talks to direct the film in May 2019 and joined the film as director in September 2019. Filming took place primarily at Pinewood Studios in England from March to July 2022.

Snow White is scheduled to be released theatrically in the United States on March 22, 2024.

Cast
 Rachel Zegler as Snow White
 Gal Gadot as the Evil Queen
 Andrew Burnap as Jonathan, a new character for the film.
 Martin Klebba as Grumpy
 Dujonna Gift
 Colin Michael Carmichael

Production

Development and pre-production

On October 31, 2016, Variety reported that Walt Disney Pictures is developing a live-action remake of Snow White and the Seven Dwarfs, with Erin Cressida Wilson being in talks to write the screenplay. On May 30, 2019, it was reported that Marc Webb was in talks to direct the film, while Cressida Wilson was reported to be writing the screenplay. In November 2021, Greta Gerwig was reported to be writing the screenplay.

Casting 
In June 2021, Rachel Zegler was cast in the titular role, and in November, Gal Gadot was cast as the Evil Queen. On December 7, 2021, during the interview with ExtraTV, Rachel Zegler revealed that Snow White will be a lot stronger than the original. A new casting search has been announced for a young actress to star as a younger version of Snow White in the live-action remake. On January 12, 2022, it was announced that Andrew Burnap was cast in the lead male role as a new character. Martin Klebba revealed at the 2022 Denver Fan Expo, that he would be portraying Grumpy in the film;  Klebba previously played similar dwarf roles in prior productions based on the "Snow White" fairy tale: as Friday in the 2001 made-for-television film Snow White: The Fairest of Them All and in the 2012 fantasy comedy Mirror Mirror as Butcher.

Snow White casting 
While appearing on Variety's Actors on Actors series with Andrew Garfield, Zegler opened up on the Snow White casting backlash. The young star recalled the casting announcement trending on Twitter for days due to the heated response to her landing the role and how she is looking to use this role and response for more positive means rather than let it get to her. She said:

Peter Dinklage's comments 
In January 2022, during an interview on Marc Maron's WTF podcast, actor Peter Dinklage, who has a form of dwarfism and has played dwarfish characters in his career, commented on the upcoming live-action Snow White remake, dismissing it as a "backward story". He said:

In response to Dinklage's comments, Disney clarified that "to avoid reinforcing stereotypes from the original animated film, we are taking a different approach with these seven characters and have been consulting with members of the dwarfism community." The film was also retitled to simply Snow White, due to the absence of the titular Seven Dwarfs from the original film. Numerous other actors with dwarfism responded negatively to Dinklage's comments, feeling he was unduly speaking on their behalf and costing them roles.

Filming
Filming for Snow White was originally set to begin in March 2020 in Vancouver, British Columbia, Canada, but it was delayed due to the COVID-19 pandemic. In August 2021, it was announced that filming will take place in the United Kingdom from March to July 2022. Principal photography began on March 7, 2022. A fire damaged the production set on March 15 at Pinewood Studios; the stage was under construction when a tree reportedly caught alight, leading to a huge blaze. Also, a Disney source confirmed that "no filming was underway". The shooting schedule was also reconfigured in order for Zegler to travel to Los Angeles to present at the 94th Academy Awards ceremony on March 27, 2022, in support of her West Side Story colleagues. While Zegler was attending the ceremony, Gadot began filming her scenes. During a podcast interview with Forbes, Gadot revealed that she will sing and dance in the film. On April 22, 2022, Gadot confirmed that she completed filming her scenes. On July 13, 2022, Zegler revealed that filming had wrapped.

Visual effects
Moving Picture Company provided the visual effects.

Music
Songwriters Benj Pasek and Justin Paul, who previously wrote the lyrics for two new songs for Disney's 2019 remake of Aladdin, are set to write new songs for the film, which is expected to also feature songs from the original film by Frank Churchill and Larry Morey.

Marketing
On September 9, 2022, during Disney's 2022 D23 Expo presentation, a 30-second first-look teaser of the film as well as first-look images were previewed.
There were quick flashes of several major settings, including Snow White's cottage in the woods, the intricately designed interior of the Queen's castle and the moss-covered forest. There were also short glimpses of Gadot as the Evil Queen questioning her magic mirror, Zegler as Snow White, and Snow White's hand falling with the poisoned apple toppling along with her. Gadot said about her role that playing the Evil Queen was "very different than what [she] had done before. [She is] used to playing the other end of where the heart should be", but she found it very "delightful" to "get under her skin". The title logo of the film was also revealed. In an interview with Vanity Fair, Zegler criticized the "jokes" that were being made about the film's modern updates, including her casting in the role of Snow White as a Latina, and addressed the film's "PC" approach, saying:

Release 
During the 2022 D23 Expo Presentation, it was announced that Snow White will be released in 2024. On September 15, 2022, the film was announced to have a release date of March 22, 2024.

See also
 Snow White and the Huntsman
 Mirror Mirror

References

External links

 

2024 films
American fantasy adventure films
American musical fantasy films
American musical films
American romantic fantasy films
Animated films about friendship
Casting controversies in film
Disney controversies
Disney film remakes
Film productions suspended due to the COVID-19 pandemic
Films about dwarfs
Films about princesses
Films about royalty
Films about shapeshifting
Films about witchcraft
Films based on Snow White
Films directed by Marc Webb
Films produced by Marc E. Platt
Films set in a fictional country
Films set in castles
Films set in Germany
Films set in mining communities
Films set in the Middle Ages
Films shot at Pinewood Studios
Live-action films based on Disney's animated films
Musicals by Pasek and Paul
Poisoning in film
Snow White (franchise)
Upcoming English-language films
Upcoming films
Walt Disney Pictures films
sv:Snow White (2024 film)